WWSF (1220 AM; "104.3 The Legends") is a radio station airing an oldies format. Established in 1957 as WSME, the station is licensed to serve Sanford, Maine, United States. WWSF is owned by Port Broadcasting.

History
WWSF signed on as WSME on November 9, 1957. Its original studio was located on lower School Street in Sanford. The call letters were changed to WPHX after being purchased by Phoenix Media/Communications Group in 1999. The station was silent as its transmitter failed in 2010, but returned to the air in June 2011.

The station was acquired by Port Broadcasting, which also owned WNBP in Newburyport, Massachusetts, in 2012. When the sale was completed, the call letters were changed to WWSF. WWSF's format is identical to that of WNBP, though the two stations were programmed separately. On January 1, 2013, WWSF shifted their format from adult standards to oldies. Port Broadcasting purchased FM translator W272CG to rebroadcast WWSF; the FM signal was launched in September 2013. In February 2019 Port Broadcasting sold W272CG to Maine Public, which used the translator to rebroadcast its statewide Classical music format. In April 2019 WWSF ceased broadcasting on 102.3 and started broadcasting on 104.3 on its new translator.

Translator

References

External links

WSF
Radio stations established in 1957
Oldies radio stations in the United States
Sanford, Maine
1957 establishments in Maine